Uxbridge Alderglade is a  nature reserve in Uxbridge in the London Borough of Hillingdon. It is managed by the Herts and Middlesex Wildlife Trust.

The site is a narrow strip of land between the Frays River and the Shire Ditch, and it was formerly a railway embankment on the Uxbridge High Street branch. It is wet woodland of crack willow and alder, with areas of marsh. Plants include birds-foot trefoil and small toadflax, and there are mammals such as the rare Brandt's bat, as well as stoats, weasels and moles.

There is access from Braybourne Close and from a footpath which starts in Harefield Road opposite Gravel Hill, and then crosses the Frays River by a footbridge.

References

External links
Uxbridge Alderglade leaflet, Herts and Middlesex Wildlife Trust

Herts and Middlesex Wildlife Trust reserves
Nature reserves in the London Borough of Hillingdon